The Generation 2 in NASCAR refers to the cars used between 1967 to 1980. The second generation of stock cars featured stock body with a modified frame, and modified chassis became part of the sport with entities such as Holman-Moody, Banjo Matthews, and Hutchenson-Pagan building chassis for teams.

Although cars began to show modifications compared to the road-going versions, NASCAR still required a minimum number of cars (500 cars in 1969) to be sold to the general public. For 1969 and 1970, Ford and Chrysler developed aerodynamic homologation special models that were later dubbed the Aero Warriors.

Changes in the United States automotive market that downsized passenger cars led to the Generation 3 cars in 1981, which featured shorter wheelbase and the cars being increasingly purpose-built.

Models

Chrysler Corporation 

 AMC Matador: 1971-1978
 Dodge Charger: 1967-1977
 Plymouth Belvedere: 1967
 Plymouth Road Runner: 1968-1980
 Plymouth Superbird: 1970

Ford Motor Company 

 Ford Fairlane: 1967-1970
 Ford Torino: 1968–1970
 Mercury Cyclone: 1968-1971
 Mercury Cyclone Spoiler II: 1969

General Motors 
 

 Chevrolet Chevelle: 1967
 Chevrolet Chevelle Laguna: 1973-1977
 Chevrolet Monte Carlo: 1971-1980
 Oldsmobile 442: 1977-1980
 Oldsmobile Cutlass: 1977-1979

References 

NASCAR Cup Series
1960s in NASCAR
1970s in NASCAR
1980s in NASCAR
1981 endings
1965 beginnings